Benedict Crowell (October 12, 1869 – September 8, 1952) was a United States military officer and politician particularly influential in military organization during and following World War I. He was United States Assistant Secretary of War from 1917 to 1920.

Biography
Crowell was born on October 12, 1869 in Cleveland, Ohio to William Crowell.

He attended Yale University, where he was admitted to the Zeta Psi fraternity, graduating in 1891 with both a Ph.D. and M.A. He returned to Cleveland to pursue a business career in steel and mining, and married Julia Cobb in December 1904.

As the First World War loomed, he rose quickly through the ranks of the United States Army Reserve, being made first an honorary major on his entry in 1916, and eventually a brigadier general before being tapped for political positions.

During the war he went on to serve as Assistant Secretary of War and Director of Munitions, founded the Army Ordnance Association in 1919, and eventually became a special consultant to the Secretary of War during World War II.

He remained influential and active in politics between the wars, serving as a principal framer of the National Defense Act of 1920, and was president of the Army Ordnance Association, a lobbying group, for a quarter of a century.

He served as president of the National Rifle Association 1930–1931.

He died in Cleveland on September 8, 1952. Crowell is buried with his wife Julia Cobb Crowell, in Arlington National Cemetery.

Air crash
On 8 October 1919, Crowell was involved in an aviation accident at Roosevelt Field, Long Island, New York.

 “MINEOLA, L. I., Oct. 8. – Benedict Crowell, assistant secretary of war, narrowly escaped injury this afternoon when an airplane in which he was riding, fell 50 feet to the ground here and overturned. Both Crowell and his pilot, Maurice Cleary, were buried under the machine, but escaped with a shaking up. The accident occurred when Cleary tried to avoid striking a hangar. Crowell announced his intention at once of going up in another machine.”

References

1869 births
1952 deaths
United States Army generals of World War I
United States Army generals
Burials at Arlington National Cemetery
Politicians from Cleveland
American lobbyists
United States Assistant Secretaries of War
Presidents of the National Rifle Association
Activists from Ohio
Yale University alumni
Military personnel from Cleveland